A thermopile is an electronic device that converts thermal energy into electrical energy. It is composed of several thermocouples connected usually in series or, less commonly, in parallel. Such a device works on the principle of the thermoelectric effect, i.e., generating a voltage when its dissimilar metals (thermocouples) are exposed to a temperature difference.

Thermocouples operate by measuring the temperature differential from their junction point to the point in which the thermocouple output voltage is measured. Once a closed circuit is made up of more than one metal and there is a difference in temperature between junctions and points of transition from one metal to another, a current is produced as if generated by a difference of potential between the hot and cold junction.

Thermocouples can be connected in series as thermocouple pairs with a junction located on either side of a thermal resistance layer. The output from the thermocouple pair will be a voltage that is directly proportional to the temperature difference across the thermal resistance layer and also to the heat flux through the thermal resistance layer. Adding more thermocouple pairs in series increases the magnitude of the voltage output. Thermopiles can be constructed with a single thermocouple pair, composed of two thermocouple junctions, or multiple thermocouple pairs.

Thermopiles do not respond to absolute temperature, but generate an output voltage proportional to a local temperature difference or temperature gradient. The amount of voltage and power are very small and they are measured in milli-watts and milli-volts using controlled devices that are specifically designed for such purpose.

Thermopiles are used to provide an output in response to temperature as part of a temperature measuring device, such as the infrared thermometers widely used by medical professionals to measure body temperature, or in thermal accelerometers to measure the temperature profile inside the sealed cavity of the sensor. They are also used widely in heat flux sensors and pyrheliometers and gas burner safety controls.  The output of a thermopile is usually in the range of tens or hundreds of millivolts. As well as increasing the signal level, the device may be used to provide spatial temperature averaging.Thermopiles are also used to generate electrical energy from, for instance, heat from electrical components, solar wind, radioactive materials, laser radiation or combustion. The process is also an example of the Peltier effect (electric current transferring heat energy) as the process transfers heat from the hot to the cold junctions.

There are also the so-called thermopile sensors, which are power meters based on the principle that the optical or laser power is converted to heat and the resulting increase in temperature is measured by a thermopile.

See also
 Seebeck effect, the physical effect responsible for the generation of voltage in a thermopile
 Thermoelectric materials, high-performance materials that can be used to construct a compact thermopile that delivers high power

References

External links
 TPA81 Thermopile detector Array Technical Specification

Electrical components